Nurzuhairah Mohammad Yazid (born 21 April 1998) is a Singaporean pencak silat practitioner. She represented Singapore at the 2018 Asian Games and won a silver medal in women's singles event that was held at Padepokan Pencak Silat Taman Mini Indonesia Indah, Jakarta. She claimed her first world title in the Female Artistic Singles Category that took place from 13 to 16 December 2018 at OCBC Arena Hall 1, Singapore Sports Hub.

She also won a gold medal in the women's singles event at the 2017 Southeast Asian Games.

Early life 
Nurzuhairah was born and raised in Singapore. She has 2 younger siblings, Nurzianah Mohd Yazid and Aniq Asri Mohd Yazid, who is also a national pencak silat athlete. When she was 11, Nurzuhairah picked up Pencak Silat encouraged by her mother and joined the national team 2 years later in 2011.

Career 
At the age of 17, Nurzuhairah first represented Singapore in the 16th World Pencak Silat Championship making her the bronze medalist for women's class a 45-50kg event that was held in Phuket, Thailand in 2015.

Nurzuhairah made her debut participating in the women's singles event at the 2017 Southeast Asian Games which shocked many as she won the gold medal defeating Indonesia and Brunei. In 2018 Asian Games, Nurzuhairah finished with 445 points as she claimed the first silver medal in pencak silat in the women's individual tunggal event behind Puspa Arumsari, of host Indonesia. This was the first time silat was included at the Asian Games as a medal sport.

Achievements

Awards

References 

Silat practitioners
Pencak silat practitioners at the 2018 Asian Games
Medalists at the 2018 Asian Games
Asian Games silver medalists for Singapore
Asian Games medalists in pencak silat
Southeast Asian Games gold medalists for Singapore
1988 births
Living people